Dewan Abdul Goni College is a college in Harirampur in the Dakshin Dinajpur district of West Bengal, India. The college is affiliated to University of Gour Banga, offering undergraduate courses.

Departments

Arts

Bengali 
English
History
Geography
Political Science
Philosophy
Education
Sanskrit
Arabic
Sociology
Computer science
Chemistry
Mathematics
Physics

Accreditation
The college is also recognized by the University Grants Commission (UGC).

See also

References

External links 
Dewan Abdul Goni College
University of Gour Banga
University Grants Commission
National Assessment and Accreditation Council

Colleges affiliated to University of Gour Banga
Academic institutions formerly affiliated with the University of North Bengal
Educational institutions established in 1994
Universities and colleges in Dakshin Dinajpur district
1994 establishments in West Bengal